GiroLive Panthers Osnabrück is a German women's professional basketball team based in Osnabrück. The team currently plays in the 1. Damen-Basketball-Bundesliga, the highest level of basketball in Germany. The team plays its home games in the Schlosswallhalle.

History
For the 2022-23 Basketball Bundesliga season, Osnabrück regained youth international Frieda Bühner, who returned to her home club after just four games for the University of Florida. Bühner had been considered one of the top talents of young Europeans. Further, the Panthers had signed Point guard Angela Rodriguez. Yet, Osnabrück had endured setbacks which resulted from the injury to young star and top performer Jenny Strozyk. Other main performers included Marie Reichert, Merrit Brennecke and Emma Eichmeyer.

Notable players

  Marie Reichert 
  Angela Rodriguez
  Noortje Driessen
  Stella Tarkovicova

See also
 Giro-Live Ballers Osnabrück

References

External links
German League profile
Eurobasket.com profile

Sport in Osnabrück
Women's basketball teams in Germany